Jo Clay (born 1977) is a member of parliament in the Australian Capital Territory Legislative Assembly representing the ACT Greens.

Clay grew up in Canberra and attended Radford College in Canberra. She then studied law before working in various companies focused on improving the environment, including setting up Send and Shred, a company that recycles shredded documents, and The Carbon Diet about reducing her carbon footprint.

At the 2020 Australian Capital Territory general election Clay won one of the five seats in Ginninderra.

References 

1977 births
Living people
Members of the Australian Capital Territory Legislative Assembly
21st-century Australian politicians
Women members of the Australian Capital Territory Legislative Assembly
Australian Greens members of the Australian Capital Territory Legislative Assembly
21st-century Australian women politicians